Scorpiops is a genus of scorpions in the family Scorpiopidae. It is distributed throughout much of Asia. The taxonomy of the group is unclear because new species and subgenera are described often, and one subgroup may represent a species complex.

Species 
Scorpiops contains the following ninety-nine species:

 Scorpiops affinis Kraepelin, 1898
 Scorpiops afghanus Lourenço & Qi, 2006
 Scorpiops alexandreanneorum (Lourenço, 2013)
 Scorpiops anthracinus (Simon, 1887)
 Scorpiops artemisae (Kovarik, Košulič, Stahlavsky, Dongkhamfu & Wongprom 2015)
 Scorpiops asthenurus (Pocock, 1900)
 Scorpiops bastawadei Kovarik, Lowe, Stockmann & Stahlawsky, 2020
 Scorpiops beccaloniae (Kovarik, 2005)
 Scorpiops bhutanensis (Tikader & Bastawade, 1983)
 Scorpiops binghamii (Pocock, 1893)
 Scorpiops birulai Kovarik, Lowe, Stockmann & Stahlawsky, 2020
 Scorpiops braunwalderi Kovarik, 2000
 Scorpiops calmonti (Lourenço, 2013)
 Scorpiops cavernicola (Lourenço & Pham, 2013)
 Scorpiops chiangmai (Lourenço, 2019)
 Scorpiops ciki Kovarik, Lowe, Stockmann & Stahlawsky, 2020
 Scorpiops citadelle (Kovarik, 2013)
 Scorpiops dakrong (Lourenço & Pham, 2014)
 Scorpiops dastychi Kovarik, 2000
 Scorpiops deccanensis (Tikader & Bastawade, 1978)
 Scorpiops demisi Kovarik, 2005
 Scorpiops dii Kovarik, Lowe, Stockmann & Stahlawsky, 2020
 Scorpiops dunlopi Kovarik, Lowe, Stockmann & Stahlawsky, 2020
 Scorpiops farkaci Kovarik, 1993
 Scorpiops feti Kovarik, 2000
 Scorpiops furai Kovarik, 2020
 Scorpiops grandjeani (Vachon, 1974)
 Scorpiops grosseri Kovarik, 2020
 Scorpiops hardwickii (Gervais, 1843)
 Scorpiops harmsi Kovarik, 2020
 Scorpiops hofereki Kovarik, 2020
 Scorpiops ingens Yin, Zhang, Pan, Li & Di, 2015
 Scorpiops irenae Kovarik, 1994
 Scorpiops jendeki Kovarik, 1994
 Scorpiops kaftani (Kovarik, 1993)
 Scorpiops kamengensis (Bastawade, 2006)
 Scorpiops kautti Kovarik, Lowe, Stockmann & Stahlawsky, 2020
 Scorpiops kejvali Kovarik, 2020
 Scorpiops krabiensis Kovarik, Lowe, Stockmann & Stahlawsky, 2020
 Scorpiops kubani (Kovarik, 2004)
 Scorpiops langxian Qi, Zhu & Lourenço, 2005
 Scorpiops leptochirus Pocock, 1893
 Scorpiops lhasa Di & Zhu, 2009
 Scorpiops lii (Di & Qiao, 2020)
 Scorpiops lindbergi (Vachon, 1980)
 Scorpiops lioneli Sulakhe, Deshpande, Dandekar, Padhye & Bastawade, 2021
 Scorpiops longimanus (Pocock, 1893)
 Scorpiops luridus Qi, Zhu & Lourenço, 2005
 Scorpiops maharashtraensis (Mirza, Sanap & Upadhye, 2014)
 Scorpiops margerisonae Kovarik, 2000
 Scorpiops montanus (Karsch, 1879)
 Scorpiops nagphani Sulakhe, Deshpande, Dandekar, Padhye & Bastawade, 2021
 Scorpiops neera Sulakhe, Deshpande, Dandekar, Padhye & Bastawade, 2021
 Scorpiops neradi (Kovarik, Pliskova & Stahlavsky, 2013)
 Scorpiops novaki (Kovarik, 2005)
 Scorpiops orioni (Kovarik, Košulič, Stahlavsky, Dongkhamfu & Wongprom 2015)
 Scorpiops problematicus (Kovarik, 2000)
 Scorpiops oligotrichus Fage, 1933
 Scorpiops pachmarhicus Bastawade, 1992
 Scorpiops pakistanus Kovarik & Ahmed, 2009
 Scorpiops pakseensis Kovarik, Lowe, Stockmann & Stahlawsky, 2020
 Scorpiops petersii Pocock, 1893
 Scorpiops phaltanensis (Sulakhe, Sayyed, Deshpande, Dandekar, Padhye & Bastawade, 2020)
 Scorpiops phatoensis Kovarik, Lowe, Stockmann & Stahlawsky, 2020
 Scorpiops prasiti Kovarik, Lowe, Stockmann & Stahlawsky, 2020
 Scorpiops profusus (Lourenço, 2017)
 Scorpiops pseudomontanus Kovarik & Ahmed, 2009
 Scorpiops puerensis (Di, Wu, Cao, Xiao & Li, 2010)
 Scorpiops rohtangensis Mani, 1959
 Scorpiops satarensis (Pocock, 1900)
 Scorpiops scheibeae Kovarik, Lowe, Stockmann & Stahlawsky, 2020
 Scorpiops schumacheri Kovarik, Lowe, Stockmann & Stahlawsky, 2020
 Scorpiops sejnai (Kovarik, 2000)
 Scorpiops sherwoodae Kovarik, Lowe, Stockmann & Stahlawsky, 2020
 Scorpiops shidian Qi, Zhu & Lourenço, 2005
 Scorpiops solegladi Kovarik, Lowe, Stockmann & Stahlawsky, 2020
 Scorpiops solidus Karsch, 1879
 Scorpiops songi Di & Qiao, 2020
 Scorpiops spitiensis Zambre, Sanap & Mirza, 2014
 Scorpiops taxkorgan Lourenço, 2018
 Scorpiops telbaila Sulakhe, Deshpande, Dandekar, Ketkar, Padhye & Bastawade, 2020
 Scorpiops tenuicauda (Pocock, 1894)
 Scorpiops thailandus Kovarik, Lowe, Stockmann & Stahlawsky, 2020
 Scorpiops thaomischorum (Kovarik, 2012)
 Scorpiops tibetanus Hirst, 1911
 Scorpiops troglodytes (Lourenço & Pham, 2015)
 Scorpiops tryznai Kovarik, 2020
 Scorpiops vachoni (Qi, Zhu & Lourenço, 2005)
 Scorpiops viktoriae (Lourenço & Košulič, 2018)
 Scorpiops vrushchik Sulakhe, Deshpande, Dandekar, Padhye & Bastawade, 2021
 Scorpiops vonwicki Birula, 1913
 Scorpiops wongpromi (Kovarik, Soleglad & Košulič, 2013)
 Scorpiops wrzecionkoi Kovarik, 2020
 Scorpiops xui (Sun & Zhu, 2010)
 Scorpiops yagmuri Kovarik, 2020
 Scorpiops yangi (Zhu, Zhang & Lourenço, 2007)
 Scorpiops zhangshuyuani (Ythier, 2019)
 Scorpiops zubairahmedi Kovarik, 2009
 Scorpiops zubairi Kovarik, 2020

References

Scorpion genera
Scorpions of Asia
Taxa named by Wilhelm Peters